Westwick is a civil parish in Harrogate district in North Yorkshire, England. It is a small parish of only , and consists of a few scattered houses. In 2012 the population of the parish was estimated at 10. As the population was less than 100 at the 2011 Census details are included by ONS in the civil parish of Skelton-on-Ure.

Westwick was historically a township in the ancient parish of Ripon in the West Riding of Yorkshire.  It became a separate civil parish in 1866.

Westwick Lock, one of two locks on the navigable section of the River Ure, is in the parish.

References 

Civil parishes in North Yorkshire